Gorlaeus can refer to:
Abraham Gorlaeus, a Flemish antiquary and collector.
David van Goorle, also known as David Gorlaeus, a Dutch philosopher.
The Gorlaeus Laboratoria of the University of Leiden.